Pennsylvania State Senate District 36 includes part of Lancaster County. It is currently represented by Republican Ryan Aument.

District profile
The district includes the following areas:

Senators since 1955

References

 

Pennsylvania Senate districts
Government of Lancaster County, Pennsylvania